A bomb shot, depth charge, or drop shot (Canada) is a kind of mixed drink. A drink in a small glass (typically a shot glass) is dropped into a larger glass holding a different drink. The resulting cocktail is typically consumed as quickly as possible ("chugged").

Preparation

A bomb shot typically consists of a shot glass of hard liquor that is dropped into a glass partially filled with beer but sometimes with some other beverage. Many variations exist. When the shot is dropped into a pint it is commonly known as a "depth charge", because it resembles the anti-submarine weapon being dropped on a target.

Examples of popular bomb shots include:
 The classic Boilermaker: a shot of whisky dropped into beer
 Flaming Doctor Pepper: a shot of Amaretto and Bacardi 151 which is lit on fire and dropped into beer
 Jägerbomb: a shot of Jägermeister dropped into a glass containing an energy drink.  Likewise, the F-Bomb  Fireball Cinnamon Whisky and Red Bull.
 Irish car bomb: a shot glass containing  Irish cream and  Irish whiskey dropped into half a pint of Guinness stout
 Sake bomb: a shot of sake dropped into beer
 Skittle Bomb: a shot of Cointreau dropped into a glass containing an energy drink
Poktanju (폭탄주): a shot of soju dropped into a glass of beer

See also

Cocktail
Drinking culture
Shooter (mixed drink)
Tequila slammer
U-Boot (beer cocktail)

Notes

Drinking culture
Cocktails